Martin Spelmann (born 21 March 1987) is a Danish professional footballer who plays as a midfielder for Danish 1st Division club Hvidovre IF.

Spelmann is a defensive midfielder, but can also play as a fullback and wingback, as well as on a wing position on the right flank.

Career
He signed for Strømsgodset before the 2019 season, but was released from the club after one season.

After a year Mjällby, Spelmann returned to Denmark and signed with Hvidovre IF on 2 June 2021.

References

External links
Martin Spelmann to AC Horsens - The Official Brøndby Club Website
OB buys Martin Spelmann - The Official OB Club Website
OB sells Martin Spelmann to Genclerbirligi - The Official OB Club Website
AGF signs with Spelmann AGF - The Official AGF Club Website
Martin Spelmann Stops in AGF - The Official AGF Club Website
Martin Spelmann is ready for Godset - The Official Strømsgodse Club Website

1987 births
Living people
Danish men's footballers
Denmark under-21 international footballers
Denmark youth international footballers
Aarhus Gymnastikforening players
Brøndby IF players
AC Horsens players
Odense Boldklub players
Gençlerbirliği S.K. footballers
Strømsgodset Toppfotball players
Mjällby AIF players
Hvidovre IF players
Danish Superliga players
Süper Lig players
Eliteserien players
Danish expatriate men's footballers
Danish expatriate sportspeople in Turkey
Danish expatriate sportspeople in Norway
Expatriate footballers in Turkey
Expatriate footballers in Norway
Association football midfielders
People from Hvidovre Municipality
Sportspeople from the Capital Region of Denmark